University Institute of Engineering and Technology may refer to:

University Institute of Engineering and Technology, Calicut
University Institute of Engineering and Technology, Kanpur University
University Institute of Engineering and Technology, Kurukshetra University
University Institute of Engineering and Technology, Panjab University